Mouriri panamensis is a species of plant in the family Melastomataceae. It is found in Colombia and Panama. It is threatened by habitat loss.

References

panamensis
Vulnerable plants
Flora of Colombia
Flora of Panama
Taxonomy articles created by Polbot